Róise Mhic Ghrianna (13 March 1879 – 6 April 1964) was a traditional Irish-language singer and storyteller.

Early life and family
Róise Mhic Ghrianna was born Róise Ní Cholla in Seascann an Róin, near Dungloe, County Donegal on 13 March 1879. She was one of five children of Tomas Ó Colla, farmer, and his wife, Maighréad. Maighréad's father was Seán Hiúdaí Mac an Bhaird, who was a noted musician. Mhic Ghrianna's father died when she was four years old. Her mother married Antain Ó Gallchóir two years later, and the family moved to his home on Árainn Mhór (Arranmore Island). Antain Ó Gallchóir was a butcher and also known as the last great storyteller on the island. The island was Irish-speaking, but her schooling was through English at Scoil na Leidhbe Gairbhe. From age 9, Mhic Ghrianna spent every spring on Inis na gCaorach, harvesting kelp and doing housework. After she left school, she worked in Lagán, in Gleann Mornáin, County Tyrone and later on the banks of Lough Swilly for three years all together. Following this she travelled between Ireland and Scotland picking potatoes.

Mhic Ghrianna married Séamas Mac Grianna, a local from Árainn Mhór she had known since childhood, when she was 29. From his father, the couple received half of his farm, around three acres on which they built a small cottage. Mhic Ghrianna lived in this house until her death. Her husband worked in Scotland annually from May to December. During this time Mhic Ghrianna kept a small farm, with a donkey and a cow. From 1934, her husband collected the dole, making creels and baskets for extra income.

Singing and storytelling
Mhic Ghrianna was visited by Rev. Cosslett Ó Cuinn in 1940, when he transcribed some of her stories and songs. This recognition gave her some confidence as a traditional singer and seanchaí as up to this point her only audience was her husband. Padraig Ua Cnáimhsí, the principal of the school in Árainn Mhór, visited her in 1951 when he transcribed 70 of her songs. He told the Irish Folklore Commission and Radio Éireann about Mhic Ghrianna, who sent Seán Ó hEochaidh and Proinsias Ó Conluain respectively. Ó Conluain's recordings of her from 1953 were broadcast on Radio Éireann in a programme about Mhic Ghrianna's life. She was also visited by Séamus Ennis when he was working for the BBC folklore commission in the 1950s.

Mhic Ghrianna died 6 April 1964. The Ó Conluain recordings from 1953 was later edited by Cathal Goan. The resulting work was released as an album by RTÉ with an accompanying booklet called Róise na nAmhrán: songs of a Donegal woman. Ua Cnáimhsí wrote her life story, Róise Rua, was published in 1983. The book won a prize at the 1983 Oireachtas na Gaeilge in Dublin.

References

External links
 RTÉ recording of Mhic Ghrianna from 1953

1879 births
1964 deaths
Irish folk singers
Musicians from County Donegal
Irish-language singers
Sean-nós singers
20th-century Irish women singers